The 2018 Boston Uprising season was the first season of Boston Uprising's existence in the Overwatch League. In Stage 3, Boston became the first team to go undefeated in a stage, posting a perfect 10–0 record; however, the team lost in the Stage 3 semifinals to New York Excelsior. The team finished with a regular season record of 26–14 — the third best of all teams in the 2018 Overwatch League season. Boston lost to Philadelphia Fusion in the quarterfinals of the season playoffs.

Preceding offseason 
On October 26, 2017, Boston Uprising announced their initial inaugural season roster, consisting of the following players:
Lucas "NotE" Meissner
Kristian "Kellex" Keller
Noh "Gamsu" Young-jin
Kwon "Striker" Nam-joo
Stanislav "Mistakes" Danilov
Shin "Kalios" Woo-yeol
Mikias "Snow" Yohannes
Jonathan "DreamKazper" Sanchez
The team went on to sign Park "Neko" Se-hyeon and Connor "Avast" Prince on November 7.

Regular season 
Boston Uprising's first-ever regular season OWL match was a 1–3 loss to the New York Excelsior on January 11, 2018. Boston found their franchise's first-ever regular season win a day later, after defeating the Florida Mayhem, 4–0. The Uprising needed a win over the Houston Outlaws in their final regular season match of Stage 1 to qualify for the Stage 1 playoffs; however, they lost the match, 2–3, and did not make the playoffs.

Through the first half of the season, Boston had a 12–8 record. On April 3, prior to the start of Stage 3, Boston picked up support player Kwon "AimGod" Min-seok, although he would not be able to play until Stage 4, once his visa process had completed. A few days later, Uprising player Jonathan "DreamKazper" Sanchez was indefinitely suspended from the Overwatch League following allegations of sexual misconduct involving a minor. Shortly after, on April 9, Boston Uprising terminated his contract. Following, Kwon "Striker" Nam-joo took over DreamKazper's starting position – a move that ultimately benefited the team. Throughout Stage 3 of the season, the Striker-led Uprising did not lose a single match, going 10–0, to become the first team to go undefeated in a stage. Boston reached the Stage 3 finals; however, they lost the finals match against the New York Excelsior. The team advanced to the Stage 3 playoff finals, but they lost to the New York Excelsior.

Prior to the start of Stage 4, Overwatch underwent a balancing update, as well as the introduction of a new hero, which would significantly reduced Striker's effectiveness. Additionally, head coach Park "Crusty" Dae-hee left the team to join the San Francisco Shock. The team went 0–6 through the first six matches of Stage 4. The Uprising finished the regular season in third place with a 26–14 record.

Postseason 
As the third seed in the season playoffs, Boston faced the Philadelphia Fusion in the quarterfinals in a best-of-three series. The Fusion won the first match, 3–1 on July 11, closing it out by defeating Boston on the map Volskaya Industries — a map that Boston had never lost on before. Boston evened the series the following day with a 3–1 win, but their season ended on July 13, after the Fusion took the final match, 3–1.

Final roster

Transactions 
Transactions of/for players on the roster during the 2018 regular season:
On April 3, Uprising signed Minseok "AimGod" Kwon.
On April 9, Uprising released Jonathan "DreamKazper" Sanchez.

Standings

Record by stage

League

Game log

Preseason

Regular season

Postseason

References 

2018 Overwatch League seasons by team
Boston Uprising
Boston Uprising seasons